José Nicomedes Grossi (15 September 1915 – 21 June 2009) was a Brazilian bishop of the Roman Catholic Church. He was one of oldest bishops in the Catholic Church and one of the oldest Brazilian bishops.

José Nicomedes Grossi was born in Cipotânea, Brazil in September 1915, he was ordained a priest on September 21, 1940. Grossi was appointed bishop of the Diocese of Bom Jesus da Lapa on August 28, 1963 and ordained bishop January 25, 1963, where he remained until his retirement on March 15, 1990.

See also
Diocese of Bom Jesus da Lapa

External links
Catholic Hierarchy

1915 births
2009 deaths
20th-century Roman Catholic bishops in Brazil
Participants in the Second Vatican Council
Roman Catholic bishops of Bom Jesus da Lapa